Davey is a surname. Notable people with the surname include:

A 

 Aaron Davey, Australian rules footballer (Melbourne Demons)
 Alan Davey (civil servant), chief executive of the Arts Council England
 Alan Davey (musician) (born 1963), former bassist with Hawkwind
 Alfred Davey (New Zealand politician) (1894–1982), New Zealand politician of the National Party
 Alwyn Davey, Australian rules footballer (Essendon Bombers)

B 

 Basil Davey (1897–1959), Commandant of the Royal Military College of Science
 Belinda Davey, Australian actress

C 

 Cathy Davey (born 1979), Irish singer-songwriter
 Charles Pierce Davey (1925–2002), American boxer and boxing commissioner
 Charlie Davey (footballer) (born 1908), a former Australian rules footballer
 Charlie Davey (cyclist) (1887–1964), a British racing cyclist
 Claude Davey (1908–2001), Wales international rugby player
 Clive Davey (born 1932), English cricketer
 Con Davey, Northern Irish footballer

D 
 Daniel Lloyd Davey (born 1973), better known as Dani Filth, the lead singer of Cradle of Filth
 Sir David Penry-Davey (1942–2015), judge of the High Court of England and Wales
 Dick Davey (born 1942), an American college basketball coach
 Ditch Davey (born 1975), an Australian actor
 Don Davey (born 1968), a former American football defensive tackle in the National Football League

E 
 Edith Mary Davey (1867–1953), British artist
 Sir Edward Davey (born 1965), British politician
 Edward Henry Davey (1854–1911), architect and politician

F 

 Ray Davey (footballer), New Zealand footballer
 Felicity Davey, Australian newsreader
 Frankland Wilmot Davey (born 1940), Canadian poet and scholar
 Frederick Hamilton Davey (1868–1915), amateur botanist
 Frederick Davey (1847–1926), English-born political figure in British Columbia

G 
 Geoffrey Davey (1906–1975), Australian civil engineer and priest
 Gerry Davey (1914–1977), English ice hockey player
 Gilbert Davey (1913–2011), British writer and radio enthusiast
 Grenville Davey (1961–2022), English sculptor and winner of the 1992 Turner Prize

H 

 Horace Davey, Baron Davey (1833–1907), British Lord of Appeal in Ordinary

I 

 Ian Davey (born 1986), British rugby union player

J 

J. Charles Davey (1869–1935), American Jesuit educator
Jack Davey (cricketer) (born 1944), English cricketer
 James Davey (rugby union)  (1880–1951), British rugby union player
 James Davey (rugby league) (born 1989), English rugby league player
 James E. Davey (1890–1960), Irish Presbyterian minister, historian and theologian
 John Davey (disambiguation), multiple people
 Josh Davey (born 1990), Scottish cricketer

K 
 Kenneth Davey, British academic
 Krista Davey (born 1978), American women's soccer player
  Keath Davey, (born in Ierlind 1973) C.E.O of Marino Software

M 

 Mark Wing-Davey (born 1948), British actor and director
 Martin L. Davey (1884–1946), American politician
 Mike Davey (baseball) (born 1952), American baseball player
 Mike Davey (soccer)  (born 1952), Jamaican footballer

P 

 Phillip Davey VC MM (1896–1953), Australian recipient of the Victoria Cross
 Philip Davey (cricketer)  (1913–2000), English cricketer

R 

 Ray Davey (1915–2012), Northern Ireland Presbyterian minister
 Ray Davey (footballer), New Zealand footballer
 Richard Davey (disambiguation), multiple people
 Robert C. Davey (1853–1908), American politician
 Robin Davey (born 1975), English musician, record producer, musical director and photographer

S 
 Seamus Davey-Fitzpatrick (born 1998), American child actor
 Shaun Davey (born 1948), Irish composer
 Simon Davey (born 1970), Welsh former footballer and football manager
 Spencer Davey (born 1983), English rugby union player
 Steve Davey (born 1948), English footballer
 Steve Joseph Davey (born 1955), Spokane Wash. Top USA ranked All American Swimmer 500 freestyle & 100 backstroke Univ of Tennessee Knoxville

T 

 Thomas Davey (governor) (c. 1758–1823), Lieutenant Governor of Van Diemens Land
 Thomas Davey (New Zealand politician) (1856–1934), New Zealand politician
 Tom Davey (baseball)  (born 1973), American baseball player
 Trevor Davey (born 1926), New Zealand politician

V 

 Valerie Davey (born 1940), British politician

English-language surnames
Surnames from given names